Ivan Jeremić (born 21 August 1961) is a Serbian professional basketball coach for the UAE National Basketball League.

Coaching career 
Jeremić coached Serbian teams Tašmajdan, Stari Grad, OKK Beograd and Hemofarm.

Jeremić joined CSKA Moscow coaching staff in 2002 when Serbian coach Dušan Ivković was named a head coach. Furthermore, he was a coaching staff member of Russian coach Evgeniy Pashutin at CSKA Moscow, UNICS and Lokomotiv-Kuban.

He had one-year stint in Libya as head coach of Al Shabab. In 2016, Jeremić was named a head coach of Al-Muharraq of the Bahraini Premier League. In 2017, he won Bahraini Cup. On 16 September 2020, he signed a one-year contract extension with Kazma of the Kuwaiti Division I.

Jeremić has been a president of the Basketball Coaches Association of Serbia (UKTS) as of January 2016.

National team 
Jeremić had two stints with the Libya national basketball team during the 2000s.

Career achievements 
As head coach
 Bahraini League champion: 1 (with: Al-Muharraq: 2018–19)
 Khalifa Bin Salman Cup winner: 1 (with: Al-Muharraq: 2016–17)

As assistant coach
 EuroCup winner: 2 (with UNICS Kazan: 2010–11; with Lokomotiv-Kuban: 2012–13)
 VTB United League champion: 1 (with: CSKA Moscow: 2009–10)
 Russian League champion: 4 (with: CSKA Moscow: 2002–03, 2003–04, 2004–05, 2009–10)
 Russian Cup winner: 2 (with: CSKA Moscow: 2004–05, 2009–10)

References

External links
 Ivan Jeremić biografija
 Coach Profile at eurobasket.com

1961 births
Living people
KK Crvena zvezda youth coaches
KK Beovuk 72 coaches
KK Hemofarm coaches
OKK Beograd coaches
Serbian men's basketball coaches
Serbian expatriate basketball people in Bahrain
Serbian expatriate basketball people in Kuwait
Serbian expatriate basketball people in Lithuania
Serbian expatriate basketball people in Libya
Serbian expatriate basketball people in Russia
Serbian expatriate basketball people in Ukraine
Serbian expatriate basketball people in the United Arab Emirates
Sportspeople from Pristina
University of Belgrade Faculty of Sport and Physical Education alumni
Kosovo Serbs